There are several types of central-force problems, depending on the physical theory being applied.

Classical physics

 Classical central-force problem
 Kepler problem, a special case (inverse-square central force)
 Two-body problem, which may be reduced to a central-force problem

General relativity

 Schwarzschild solution, the geodesics of the Schwarzschild metric

Quantum mechanics

 Hydrogen-like atom, a special case (inverse-square central force)